Pierre-Henri Menthéour (9 May 1960 – 12 April 2014) was a French professional road bicycle racer.

Menthéour was born in Algiers. His brother Erwann was also a racing cyclist.

He won one stage in the 1984 Tour de France as well as the final Team Classification with Renault–Elf–Gitane. His teammate Laurent Fignon won that Tour. He retired in 1986, but returned to competition at the age 36 in order to attempt to break the Hour record of France.

In 2012 he admitted to doping during his career.

He went on to enjoy success as a journalist and TV cameraman, working on Eurosport's Tour de France coverage but also working in other areas, and won an award for a 2008 documentary on Afghanistan which he made for the French TV series Envoyé spécial.

Death 
On 12 April 2014 Pierre-Henri Menthéour died of cancer.

Career achievements

Major results

1984
Concarneau
Tour de France:
Winner stage 13
1992
Tour du Finistère

Grand Tour general classification results timeline

References

External links 

Official Tour de France results for Pierre-Henri Menthéour

1960 births
2014 deaths
French male cyclists
French Tour de France stage winners
People from Algiers
Doping cases in cycling